The Shine Championship is a women's professional wrestling championship in Shine Wrestling. Championship reigns are determined by professional wrestling matches, in which competitors are involved in scripted rivalries. These narratives create feuds between the various competitors, which cast them as villains and heroines. Ivelisse  has the most reigns at 4.

Championship Tournaments

Inaugural Championship Tournament (2013)
The tournament was held over two months from April 19 to July 12, 2013, at Shine 9 and Shine 10, at The Orpheum in Ybor City, Florida. The first two rounds, semis and final were all held on the July 12 event called Shine 11.

Saraya Knight defeated Su Yung
Jessicka Havok defeated Madison Eagles
Rain defeated Angelina Love
Santana Garrett defeated Kimberly
Leva Bates defeated Taylor Made
Mia Yim defeated Mercedes Martinez
LuFisto defeated Mercedes Martinez, Nikki Roxx and Su Yung in a fatal four–way match, winner faces Rain in the first round
Ivelisse defeated Awesome Kong, Angelina Love and Kimberly in a four–way match, winner faces Garrett in the first round

notes:
Jessicka Havok defeated Portia Perez to keep her spot in the tournament at Shine 9
Allysin Kay defeated Nikki Roxx but was later suspended for 90 days by Lexie Fyfe and automatically eliminated at Shine 9
Jazz defeated Ivelisse but never entered the tournament for undisclosed reasons

The tournament brackets were:

Second championship tournament (2018)

Reigns

Combined reigns

See also
Shine Wrestling
Shine Tag Team Championship
Shimmer Women Athletes
Shimmer Championship
Shimmer Tag Team Championship

References

External links 

  SHINE Championship

Women's professional wrestling championships
WWNLive championships
Shimmer Women Athletes